The northern grotto salamander (Eurycea nerea) is a species of salamander in the family Plethodontidae. It is endemic to the south-central United States.

Taxonomy 
It is now considered a member of the genus Eurycea, but was originally described as Typhlotriton nereus.

It was described in 1968, but was later synonymized with the grotto salamander (E. spelaea), but a 2017 study found substantial genetic differences between the clades classified in E. spelaea and once again split them into distinct species. It is thought to have diverged from the southern grotto salamander (E. braggi) during the Late Miocene. All three grotto salamanders are thought to descend from an ancestral surface-dwelling form.

Distribution and habitat 

It is found in the southern Ozark Plateau of Missouri and adjacent portions of Arkansas. It is primarily found in the Salem Plateau and a small portion of the adjacent West Springfield Plateau. It inhabits freshwater springs (as a juvenile), inland karsts, and caves.

Description 
This is a troglobitic species that has evolved several troglomorphisms such as a pale coloration and reduced eyesight, much like E. spelaea. Alongside E. spelaea and E. braggi, it is the only blind, troglobitic salamander that undergoes full metamorphosis.

References 

nerea
Cave salamanders
Amphibians of the United States
Endemic fauna of the United States
Amphibians described in 1944